Ahmad Khan Madhosh (Sindhi (احمد خان مدهوش), Urdu (احمد خان مدہوش) (b.5 April 1931, d. 26 June 2010) was a famous poet of Sindhi language.

Early life
He was born at the village of Sultan Chandio near Khairpur Nathan Shah, Dadu District. He was Soomro by caste. He passed the examination of Sindhi final from Johi which was equal to matriculation and joined the profession of teacher.

Contribution
He was a renowned poet of the Sindhi language and started to create poetry in 1960 and his first poem appeared in the Quarterly Mehran (magazine) by Sindhi Adabi Board Jamshoro Sindh. His two poetry books Nazar mein Nazar Band and Dil Joon Galihiyoon were published. Many Sindhi singers, especially, Mumtaz Lashari, Manzoor Sakhirani and others have sung his songs.

Death
Madhosh died on 26 June 2010 in Karachi due to cancer. and was buried at Johi. He was 79 years old and left behind two son Khalil Soomro and four daughters.

References

1931 births
2010 deaths
Sindhi people